Benedikt Höwedes (born 29 February 1988) is a German former professional footballer who played as a defender. He spent the majority of his playing career for Schalke 04, which he captained for six seasons, and represented the Germany national football team from 2011 to 2017. At international level, Höwedes won the World Cup with Germany in 2014, and was one of only three players to play every single minute of the tournament. Höwedes described himself as a 'multi-functional player' in the defence, who can play in the centre or as both a left or right-sided full back.

Club career

Schalke
Höwedes started playing football for his hometown club TuS Haltern in 1994. In 2001, he was transferred to the youth teams of FC Schalke 04. In 2003, he became captain of Schalke's under-19 team and as a member of that team he won the Under 19 Bundesliga in 2006.

In September 2007, the German Football Association honoured Höwedes with the Fritz Walter Medal as the best player of his age-group for the 2006–07 season.

In January 2007, he signed a professional contract with Schalke, which ran until 30 June 2010, he then joined Schalke's Bundesliga squad in July. Until October 2007, however, he only played for Schalke's second team in the Oberliga (fourth division).

Höwedes' first professional match was in the Champions League on 3 October 2007.

On 10 December 2008, Höwedes extended his contract which will keep him at the club until 30 June 2014. On 23 July 2011, Höwedes became captain of Schalke. On 9 March 2013, Höwedes extended his contract with Schalke, until 30 June 2017.

Loan to Juventus
On 30 August 2017, Höwedes joined Juventus on a one-year loan deal for €3.5 million plus €3 million variables, with an option to buy for €13M. On 26 November, Höwedes made his Serie A and Juventus debut, in a 3–0 home win over Crotone. On 15 April 2018, he scored his first goal for Juventus, in his second appearance for the club, in a 3–0 home win over Sampdoria.

Lokomotiv Moscow
On 29 July 2018, Höwedes left Schalke to join Lokomotiv Moscow. Lokomotiv announced the signing of a 4-year contract with Höwedes on 31 July 2018. On 7 October 2018, he scored his first goal for Lokomotiv late in a game against PFC CSKA Moscow, giving his team a 1–0 victory.

On 8 June 2020, his contract with Lokomotiv was terminated by mutual consent as he decided to return to Germany for family reasons.

Retirement
On 31 July 2020, Höwedes announced his retirement from professional football. Overall he played more than 275 top-flight matches in Germany, Italy and Russia.

International career

Höwedes played for the under-18 team and under-19 team and appeared in all matches up to and including the semi-final at the 2007 UEFA European Under-19 Championship. On 5 September 2007, he made his first and only under-20 team appearance, due to the fact that he was turning out for the under-21 team on a regular basis.

He was a member of the squad which won the 2009 UEFA European Under-21 Championship and started in Germany's 4–0 win against England in the final.

On 29 May 2011, he made his debut for the senior team in a friendly against Uruguay. On 7 June 2011, he played his first official match against Azerbaijan in UEFA Euro 2012 qualifying, Germany won the match 3–1, with Höwedes setting up the first goal, which was scored by Mesut Özil.

Höwedes was selected for the German squad for UEFA Euro 2012 but did not make an appearance in the tournament. On 15 August 2012, he scored his first goal in a 1–3 friendly defeat at home against Argentina.

After making three appearances during 2014 FIFA World Cup qualification, Höwedes was named in Germany's squad for the tournament finals. He was named in the starting line-up at left back against Portugal in the team's opening match, making his tournament debut. Later on, he won the tournament, along with his team. In the 2014 World Cup final, Höwedes went close to opening the scoring by hitting the goalpost with a header after a corner kick in the last seconds of the first half. Höwedes was also one of three German players who played every minute of all seven World Cup games, alongside goalkeeper Manuel Neuer and captain Philipp Lahm.

He won his last cap in March 2017. Benedikt Höwedes appeared 44 times for the DFB premium team.

Managerial career
In August 2021, it was announced that Höwedes will begin a trainee program containing the tasks of the Germany national football team's managerial position accompanying his UEFA master's degree. The program is scheduled to last until the 2022 FIFA World Cup.

Style of play
A large, versatile, reliable, and tenacious defender, Höwedes was considered a defensive all-rounder, as he could be deployed in any defensive position. Höwedes's main playing position was at centre back, but he could also be deployed as a right or left-sided full back and as a right or left-sided wing-back, which were the main positions that Höwedes was deployed in under Jens Keller. In the early phase of his youth career, Höwedes mainly played as a defensive midfielder; after joining Schalke, however, with whom he began his professional football career, he played mainly as a left-back. Höwedes's main defensive strengths lay in his ability to win his oppositional one-on-one duels consistently, his fine heading ability, and his no-nonsense style of play. Höwedes's height and high-jumping ability also made him an aerial threat, and saw him both score and set-up goals with his head. Additionally, Höwedes was also known for his well-timed sliding tackles and standing tackles, as well as his good first-time passing, technique, positional sense, and great physical strength. Despite his ability as a defender, he often struggled with injuries throughout his career.

Career statistics

Club

Ref.:

International

Ref.:

Scores and results lists Germany's goal tally first:

Honours

Schalke 04
DFB-Pokal: 2010–11
DFL-Supercup: 2011

Juventus
Serie A: 2017–18
Coppa Italia: 2017–18

Lokomotiv Moscow
Russian Cup: 2018–19

Germany U21
UEFA European Under-21 Championship: 2009

Germany
FIFA World Cup: 2014

Individual
Fritz Walter Medal U19 Gold Medal: 2007

Personal life
Höwedes was born in Haltern, North Rhine-Westphalia, and he attended Gesamtschule Berger Feld.

He is married to childhood sweetheart; Lisa Wesseler and together they have one son; Bas who was born in October 2018.

References

External links

1988 births
Living people
People from Haltern
Sportspeople from Münster (region)
German footballers
TuS Haltern players
FC Schalke 04 II players
FC Schalke 04 players
Bundesliga players
Regionalliga players
Juventus F.C. players
Serie A players
FC Lokomotiv Moscow players
Russian Premier League players
German expatriate footballers
German expatriate sportspeople in Italy
Germany under-21 international footballers
Germany international footballers
Germany youth international footballers
Association football defenders
UEFA Euro 2012 players
2014 FIFA World Cup players
UEFA Euro 2016 players
FIFA World Cup-winning players
Expatriate footballers in Italy
Expatriate footballers in Russia
People educated at the Gesamtschule Berger Feld
Footballers from North Rhine-Westphalia